Sean Dunphy (30 November 1937 – 17 May 2011) was an Irish singer who represented Ireland at the 1967 Eurovision Song Contest, achieving second place with "If I Could Choose". He was also the first Irish singer to record in Nashville.

Career

Born in Whitehall, Dublin, Dunphy first became famous in his home country as lead singer with The Hoedowners, a showband led by trumpeter Earl Gill. Between 1966 and 1973, fourteen singles by Sean Dunphy and The Hoedowners entered the Irish Charts including, in 1969, two number ones: "Lonely Woods of Upton" and "When The Fields Were White With Daisies". In the late 1970s, Dunphy went on to have two further hits as a solo artist.

Despite undergoing a quadruple heart bypass operation in 2007, Sean Dunphy continued to give live performances. In March 2009, he sang many of his greatest hits in a one-off concert at Dublin's National Concert Hall. His last public engagement was at a charity event twenty-four hours before his death.

Dunphy died at his home in Baldoyle, County Dublin and is buried at Greenogue cemetery in Ashbourne, County Meath.

Sean Dunphy and his wife Lily had four children. His son Brian is a member of the Irish band, The High Kings.

Discography

Sean Dunphy and the Hoedowners

Sean Dunphy solo

References

External links
 Profile of Sean Dunphy and The Hoedowners at irish-showbands.com

1937 births
2011 deaths
Eurovision Song Contest entrants of 1967
Irish country singers
Eurovision Song Contest entrants for Ireland
Irish male singers
Irish pop singers
People from Whitehall, Dublin
Pye Records artists